The following is a filmography of David Lean, whose body of work in the film industry spanned the period from 1930 to 1984. This list includes the release year of the film, the role(s) Lean had in the production of each film, and additional notes such as awards and nominations. Lean directed 17 feature films in total. Lean often directed the large-scale epics The Bridge on the River Kwai (1957), Lawrence of Arabia (1962), Doctor Zhivago (1965), and A Passage to India (1984). He also directed two adaptations of Charles Dickens novels, Great Expectations (1946) and Oliver Twist (1948), as well as the romantic drama Brief Encounter (1945).

Originally a film editor in the early 1930s, Lean made his directorial debut with 1942's In Which We Serve, which was the first of four collaborations with Noël Coward. Beginning with Summertime in 1955, Lean began to make internationally co-produced films financed by the big Hollywood studios; in 1970, however, the critical failure of his film Ryan's Daughter led him to take a fourteen-year break from filmmaking, during which he planned a number of film projects which never came to fruition. In 1984 he had a career revival with A Passage to India, adapted from E. M. Forster's novel; it was an instant hit with critics but proved to be the last film Lean would direct.

He received seven Academy Award for Best Director nominations, which he won twice for The Bridge on the River Kwai and Lawrence of Arabia, he has seven films in the British Film Institute's Top 100 British Films (with three of them being in the top five) and was awarded the AFI Life Achievement Award in 1990.

Filmography 
As director

As editor only

References

External links 

Filmography
Director filmographies
British filmographies